Maine's 2nd congressional district is a congressional district in the U.S. state of Maine. Covering , it comprises nearly 80% of the state's total land area. The district comprises most of the land area north of the Portland and Augusta metropolitan areas. It includes the cities of Lewiston, Bangor, Auburn, and Presque Isle. The district is represented by Democrat Jared Golden, who took office in 2019.

It is the largest district east of the Mississippi River and the 24th largest overall. It is the second-most rural district in the United States, with 72% of its population in rural areas, and it has the second highest proportion of non-Hispanic White residents (94%); only Kentucky's 5th congressional district exceeds it in the two categories. Furthermore, it is the only district in New England that voted for Donald Trump in 2020. Additionally, it was one of five districts that voted for Trump in 2020 while being won or held by a Democrat in 2022.

History
Until the Missouri Compromise was reached in 1820, Maine was a part of Massachusetts as the District of Maine. When it became a state in 1820, Maine had seven congressional districts credited to it (Massachusetts including Maine had been given 20 districts after the 1810 Census). Since Maine became a state, all but two districts have been reallocated to other states.

In 2018, the district became the first in the United States to elect the ranked choice winner over the first-past-the-post winner, after a referendum in 2016 changed Maine's electoral system from the latter system to the former. Incumbent representative Bruce Poliquin won a plurality of the first preference votes. However, the second and third preferences from two independent candidates flowed overwhelmingly to Jared Golden, allowing him to win with 50.6% of the vote once all preferences were distributed.

Historically, the district has tended to keep its incumbents regardless of party. When Golden defeated two-term Republican incumbent Bruce Poliquin in 2018, it was the first time an incumbent had lost reelection in the district since 1916. Since 1965, the district's representatives have frequently sought statewide office. Three U.S. senators (Democrat William Hathaway and Republicans William Cohen and Olympia Snowe), one governor (Democrat John Baldacci), and one nominee for governor (Democrat Mike Michaud) all previously held the seat. Due to its size, the district's congressman is usually reckoned as a statewide figure; its footprint includes portions of all three television markets anchored in the state.

Composition
The boundaries of the District are open for reconsideration in light of population shifts revealed by the decennial US Census. Until 2011, Maine's constitution provided for the state to reapportion the Congressional districts based on census data every ten years beginning in 1983, which would have meant that the state was next due to consider redistricting in 2013. However, a federal lawsuit filed in March 2011 led to a requirement that Maine speed up its redistricting process. Maine state legislators approved new boundaries on September 27, 2011.

Androscoggin County
Aroostook County
Franklin County
Hancock County
Part of Kennebec County:
Albion
Belgrade 
Benton
Clinton
Fayette
Gardiner
Litchfield
Monmouth 
Mount Vernon
Oakland
Randolph
Rome 
Sidney
Unity Township
Vienna 
Wayne
West Gardiner
Oxford County
Penobscot County
Piscataquis County
Somerset County
Waldo County
Washington County

Election results from presidential races
In US presidential elections, most states give all the state's electoral votes to the candidate that wins the statewide popular vote. This is a type of winner-takes-all voting. Maine and Nebraska instead use the congressional district method, where the winner in each of the state's congressional districts gets one electoral vote, and the statewide winner gets an additional two electoral votes. Since Maine introduced this system in 1969, Maine's second district voted the same way as the entire state of Maine for every election until 2016 and 2020.

List of members representing the district

Election history

See also

Maine's congressional districts
List of United States congressional districts

References

External links

Congressional Biographical Directory of the United States 1774–present
Former Congressman Bruce Poliquin's web site

02
North Maine Woods
Androscoggin County, Maine
Aroostook County, Maine
Franklin County, Maine
Hancock County, Maine
Kennebec County, Maine
Oxford County, Maine
Penobscot County, Maine
Piscataquis County, Maine
Somerset County, Maine
Waldo County, Maine
Washington County, Maine
Constituencies established in 1821
Constituencies disestablished in 1883
Constituencies established in 1885
1821 establishments in Maine
1883 disestablishments in Maine
1885 establishments in Maine